Percy Belgrave Lucas,  (2 September 1915 – 20 March 1998), commonly known as Laddie Lucas, was a Royal Air Force officer, left-handed golfer, author and Member of Parliament (MP).

Early life and family
Lucas was born on 2 September 1915 in the old clubhouse at Prince's Sandwich Bay, Kent, the son of Percy Montagu Lucas, co-founder of Prince's Golf Club, Sandwich.  His father died when he was aged 11. A company of Highlanders based nearby often inquired about "the wee laddie" when he was a baby, resulting in his nickname.

Lucas was educated at Stowe School, and Pembroke College, Cambridge, where he read Economics. While at Cambridge, he captained the golf team, was the top amateur in the 1935 Open Championship and was considered the finest left-handed player in the world at the age of 19.

In 1946, Lucas married Jill Addison, the sister of Thelma Bader, wife of fellow flying ace Douglas Bader, of whom he wrote a best-selling biography. The couple had five grandchildren.

Early career
After graduating from Cambridge, Lucas was interviewed by Lord Beaverbrook for a post on the Sunday Express. He impressed Beaverbrook sufficiently that the publisher took him to supper that night and later hired him as a sports writer. He remained with the Sunday Express until the outbreak of war, when he volunteered for the Royal Air Force (RAF).

Royal Air Force
Lucas joined the RAF in June 1940 and went to Canada to undertake flying training at the Flying Training School as part of the Empire Air Training Scheme. On completion of his training, he was assigned to No. 66 Squadron in August 1941, based in Cornwall, where he flew a Spitfire on convoy patrols. He sought a transfer to Burma for more action but ended up at Malta instead, arriving there in February 1942. During the Battle of Malta, he commanded No. 249 Squadron.

In July 1942, Lucas was awarded the Distinguished Flying Cross. The citation read:

In the autumn of 1942, Lucas was assigned as aide-de-camp to the Duke of Kent, but gave it up to his friend Michael Strutt, who was already acquainted with the duke. Two weeks later, on 25 August 1942, both were killed in an air crash when the Short Sunderland flying boat in which Strutt was also a passenger crashed into a hillside near Dunbeath, Caithness, in bad weather. This tragedy troubled Lucas.

In 1943, he took command of No. 616 Squadron; later, he commanded the Spitfire wing at RAF Coltishall. Lucas was awarded the Distinguished Service Order (DSO) in January 1944.  The citation read:

After an imposed rest period on ground duties, "flying a desk", in December 1944 Lucas asked to be given charge of an operational squadron again. After re-training on the two-crew Mosquito, Lucas took over command of No. 613 Squadron (City of Manchester) Squadron equipped with Mosquitos and based at Cambrai-Épinoy in France (Nord department). He immediately resumed his practice of "leading from the front", which gained the respect of the highly experienced squadron air crews. The squadron was involved in low-level tactical support missions and strikes. Between 1944 and 1945, he served with RAF Second Tactical Air Force in North-West Europe. He was awarded a Bar to his DSO in October 1945 for making numerous attacks on enemy communications, often in appalling weather conditions. He resigned his commission in 1945.

Postwar career
After the war, he was encouraged to fight the 1945 general election as a Conservative and stood for Fulham West, where he lost to the sitting Member of Parliament (MP), Edith Summerskill, one of Labour's most prominent women in government following their landslide. At the 1950 general election, he was elected as Conservative MP for Brentford and Chiswick.  He held the seat at the next two elections, but retired at the 1959 general election.

He wrote a popular column for the Sunday Express, and authored several books on golf and airmen around the world, as well as an idiosyncratic but much-admired history of the Second World War Siege of Malta.

Lucas played in the 1947 and 1949 Great Britain & Ireland Walker Cup team, being the captain in 1949. After the war, he was an administrator on the Sports Council.  Although an amateur, he was influential in the founding of the professional tour in Europe in the early 1970s.  At the time of his death, he was serving as a vice-president of both the Golf Foundation and the Association of Golf Writers.

In 1957 he became the Managing Director of the Greyhound Racing Association replacing Francis Gentle who remained as Chairman of the company.

He was made a Commander of the Order of the British Empire in 1981.

In April 1984, Eamonn Andrews surprised Lucas for This Is Your Life.

Lucas died at home in Chelsea on 20 March 1998.

Memorials
There is a commemorative plaque at Prince's Golf Club, Sandwich by the 3rd tee on the Himalayas course which marks the spot where Lucas used his local knowledge of the course to make an emergency landing after his Spitfire was crippled over northern France during the war.  A golf tournament for boys and girls aged 8–13 years, the "Laddie Lucas Spoon", is held annually at Prince's.

Publications
 Five Up: A Chronicle of Five Lives (1978)
 The Sport of Princes: Reflections of a Golfer (1980)
 Flying Colours: The Epic Story of Douglas Bader (1981)
 Wings of War: Airmen of All Nations Tell Their Stories (1983)
 Out of the Blue: Role of Luck in Air Warfare, 1917–66 (1985)
 Malta: The Thorn in Rommel's Side – Six Months That Turned the War (1992)
 Voices In The Air 1939–1945
 Thanks for the Memory: Unforgettable Characters in Air Warfare, 1939–45
 Great Battles: Courage in the Skie
 Venturer Courageous: Group Captain Leonard Trent, VC, DFC (with James Sanders)
 Courage in the Skies: Great Air Battles from the Somme to Desert Storm (with Johnnie Johnson)
 Glorious Summer: Story of the Battle of Britain (with Johnnie Johnson)
 Winged Victory: A Last Look Back – The Personal Reflections of Two Royal Air Force Leaders (with Johnnie Johnson)
 The Maltese Spitfire: 1942 – One Pilot and One Plane Searching for the Enemy on Land and Sea (with Harry Coldbeck)
 ''John Jacobs' Impact on Golf – the man and his methods, 1987

Team appearances
Amateur
Walker Cup (representing Great Britain & Ireland): 1936, 1947, 1949 (playing captain)

References

External links 
 
 Imperial War Museum 1989 interview

Alumni of Pembroke College, Cambridge
Amateur golfers
British World War II pilots
English male golfers
Left-handed golfers
English male journalists
Companions of the Distinguished Service Order
Commanders of the Order of the British Empire
Conservative Party (UK) MPs for English constituencies
People educated at Stowe School
Recipients of the Distinguished Flying Cross (United Kingdom)
Royal Air Force officers
UK MPs 1950–1951
UK MPs 1951–1955
UK MPs 1955–1959
1915 births
1998 deaths
People in greyhound racing